Daffiama-Bussie-Issa is one of the constituencies represented in the Parliament of Ghana. It elects one Member of Parliament (MP) by the first past the post system of election. Daffiama-Bussie-Issa is located in the Daffiama-Bussie-Issa District of the Upper West Region of Ghana.

Boundaries 
The seat is located within the Daffiama-Bussie-Issa District of the Upper West Region of Ghana. Its western neighbour is Nadowli-Kaleo District. To the north is the Jirapa and Sissala West to the east the Sissala East and to the south east the and Wa East to the south the Wa.

History 
The constituency was changed in 2012 when the initial Nadowli District was divided into the Nadowli-Kaleo District and Daffiama-Bussie-Issa District. Therefore, the Nadowli-Kaleo became the new constituency for the initial Nadawli West and the Nadowli East constituency was also changed to Daffiama-Bussie-Issa constituency.

Members of Parliament 
for initial 1992–2000 (Nadawli South) 2004–2008 (see Nadowli East)

References

See also 

 List of Ghana Parliament constituencies

Parliamentary constituencies in the Upper West Region